Alpha Epsilon Phi ( or AEPhi) is a sorority and a member of the National Panhellenic Conference, an umbrella organization overseeing 26 North American sororities.

It was founded on October 24, 1909, at Barnard College in Morningside Heights, New York City by seven Jewish women; Helen Phillips Lipman, Ida Beck Carlin, Rose Gerstein Smolin, Augustina "Tina" Hess Solomon, Lee Reiss Liebert, Rose Salmowitz Marvin, and Stella Strauss Sinsheimer. As a national sorority, it has multiple chapters across the United States, rather than a local sorority which has strictly one site location and chapter. Although it is a historically Jewish sorority, it is not a religious organization. Alpha Epsilon Phi welcomes women of all religions and race who honor, respect, and appreciate the Jewish faith and identity and are comfortable in a Jewish milieu to pledge for sisterhood.

History 
In 1889, Barnard College was founded as a women's college connected to Columbia University, which did not admit women at the time. A decade later, the campus had student organizations such as social sororities; however, not all sororities allowed Jewish women or other minorities to join at the time. The discrimination frustrated one student, Helen Phillips, who then fostered the idea for forming an organization for Jewish women to promise the same friendship and sisterhood as other sororities. Phillips suggested to some other women that they meet in her room and discuss the possibilities of such a club. These others were seven Jewish Barnard College students who would found the sorority – Helen Phillips, Ida Beck, Rose Gerstein, Augustina Hess, Lee Reiss, Stella Strauss, and Rose Salmowitz.

Alpha Epsilon Phi was formally chartered on October 24, 1909at Barnard College. The sorority encouraged community service, academic presence on campuses, an increased and positive social presence and reputation, and providing a "college home and family" for each of its sisters. This idea was the basis upon which Alpha Epsilon Phi was founded. "It was her [Helen Phillips'] idea and her persistence more than anything else that brought Alpha Epsilon Phi into existence," one founder wrote. "I sometimes think that some of those ties were more necessary to Helen than to the others in this group because Helen had no mother and no sisters or brothers, and to her a group of adopted sisters was more of a need and had more significance."

In 1951, the sorority joined the National Panhellenic Conference.

Symbols 
The sorority's founders chose the pearl as the fraternity gem because they believed its glowing beauty and the fact that it is a jewel that literally grows. The founders also chose the colors green and white to represent growth and fellowship, respectively. The last symbol of Alpha Epsilon Phi which can be directly attributed to the founders is the flower, selected for its simple beauty and for the fact that it matches the sorority's colors. The lily of the valley's Hebrew translation is "shoshannat-ha-amaqim."

The columns of Alpha Epsilon Phi were added in 1916, the sorority's seventh year in existence. It was decided to create a simple insignia as opposed to a more elaborate crest like that of other Greek letter organizations. Each column of the insignia holds special significance to the members. The three columns Α, Ε, and Φ represent faculty approval, student esteem and sorority fidelity, in order.

At the 1977 National Convention, the sorority chose the giraffe as their mascot. The Alpha Kappa Chapter at Miami University suggested this mascot, which was chosen because it stands the tallest and has the largest heart.

Women who have passed their new member period and are initiated as full sisters receive a 24 karat gold badge with A, E, and Φ, on the front with 27 pearls. Α has 8 pearls, Ε has 9 pearls, and Φ has 10 pearls. On the back are the new sister's initials.

Motto, handshake, and tagline 
Multa Corda Una Causa... Many Hearts One Purpose was chosen as the open motto in the early years of the sorority to express the intentions of the founders of Alpha Epsilon Phi. 

Sisters have a handshake to greet one another and prove they are actual members of the sisterhood.

In 2001, the sorority unveiled its updated image, complete with a new tagline: Above All Else. In full, the "Core Values Statement" is as follows:  Above all else, Alpha Epsilon Phi inspires exemplary women who are: Enriched by sisterhood and unconditional friendships, Dedicated to selfless service and inspiring others, and Committed to intellectual growth and personal development. As a lifelong member of Alpha Epsilon Phi, I will: Respect our shared heritage and traditions, Exhibit high ideals and moral character, Fulfill expectations and responsibilities of membership, and Continually exemplify the values of beauty, strength and wisdom as embodied by the three columns of our insignia.

National philanthropies

Elizabeth Glaser Pediatric AIDS Foundation 

The Elizabeth Glaser Pediatric AIDS Foundation (abbreviated EGPAF) is a public charity which "seeks to prevent pediatric HIV infections and to eradicate pediatric AIDS through research, advocacy, and prevention and treatment programs."It was founded in 1988 by Elizabeth Glaser (a member of AEPhi's Sigma chapter), Susan DeLaurentis, and Susie Zeegen (a member of AEPhi's Xi chapter). There are over 15 nations that work with the Elizabeth Glaser Pediatric Aids Foundation.

Elizabeth Glaser pledged AEPhi while a student at the University of Wisconsin-Madison. In 1981, Glaser contracted HIV through a blood transfusion during childbirth. Glaser and her husband, Paul, later learned that she passed the virus to her children, Ariel and Jake, without knowing it. In 1988, the Glasers lost one child, seven-year-old Ariel, to an AIDS-related illness, and thus, they created the Pediatric AIDS Foundation with their friends Susie Zeegen and Susan DeLaurentis to honor their child.

AEPhi recognizes it as one of its national philanthropies. Sorority members carry on Elizabeth's legacy by raising awareness of pediatric AIDS on their campuses through fundraising events and volunteer work.

Sharsheret 

Sharsheret is one of Alpha Epsilon Phi's national charitable partners. It is a national non-profit organization dedicated to serving young Jewish women with breast cancer. Hebrew for "chain," Sharsheret acts as a link between all young Jewish women and their families who face breast cancer. It was founded in November 2001 by Rochelle Shorentz, a Law Clerk to United States Supreme Court Justice's Ruth Bader Ginsburg, a sister of Alpha Epsilon Phi. After the Supreme Court Justice was diagnosed with breast cancer at 28 years old, she researched the disease's prognosis in young Jewish women and families with Rochelle Shorentz, and the two partnered together to combat over 23,000 breast and ovarian cancer cases.

Sharsheret's contributions to women's health earned the organization the New York State Innovation in Breast Cancer Early Detection and Research Award, and it was selected as a member of the LIVESTRONG Young Adult Alliance. Rochelle Shorentz was brought onto the Federal Advisory Committee on Breast Cancer in Young Women by the Centers for Disease Control and Prevention honorary members. Sharsheret inspired the launching of a national ovarian cancer organization. By interacting with young Jewish families, women, and men, Sharsheret recognizes the increasing need for knowledge about breast and ovarian cancers. The organization hosts a variety of national events, such as the 2013 NYC Schlep: Jewish Breast & Ovarian Cancer Run/Walk, in New York City's Bryant Park.

Membership 
Alpha Epsilon Phi currently has 49 active collegiate chapters across the United States and Canada. Alumnae groups exist across various areas and have events to celebrate their Founder's Day, socialize, or interact with other local Panhellenic alumnae groups.

The sorority has a magazine to chronicle news relevant to the organization. Debuting as Alpha Epsilon Phi Quarterly in November 1917, the title was changed to Columns in the late 1920s. It is published semiannually in the fall and spring seasons and is sent to collegians, alumnae volunteers, donors, subscribers, interfraternal partners and friends. Fraternity and sorority professionals and vice presidents of student affairs on campuses with chapters of Alpha Epsilon Phi also receive issues of the magazine. Families contribute to Columns to sponsor philanthropic events and activities that current members, alumnae, family members, and friends can participate in from Atlantic to Pacific.

Organizational structure 
Each collegiate chapter of Alpha Epsilon Phi has an executive board made up of the following positions, elected each calendar year:

President: In charge of overseeing all of the chapters activities, reporting to advisers and other members of nationals, as well as representing the sorority at Greek and college-wide events. President presides over all chapter meetings and runs executive board meetings. President oversees the activity of the Vice presidents. President must have had prior experience serving on the executive board in order to be elected.

VP Operations: In charge of all operational tasks for the chapter and serves as the second in command. This includes maintaining the listserve, taking minutes at each meeting, taking attendance at weekly chapter meetings as well as other chapter events. VP operations is in charge of all scheduling tasks for the chapter and serves as the secretary for the executive board.

VP Standards: In charge of enforcing chapter's by-laws and constitution. VP standards deals with any judicial issues that come up with sisters of the chapter (violations of social policy, attendance or financial issues). VP standards presides over standards hearings and has members from each class who sit on standards board.

VP Finance: In charge of setting and collecting member's dues as well as financing from nationals and the university. VP Finance is in charge of setting the chapter's budget for each semester and is in charge of reimbursing chapter members. VP finance is responsible for paying anyone owed by the chapter (venues, t-shirt distributors, etc.)

VP Recruitment: Organizes all recruitment events as well as the details that correspond with them (finance, attendance, etc.), voting and works with nationals and panhellenic to establish total and quota. VP Recruitment is responsible for setting up the appropriate recruitment events during an "off semester".

VP New Member Education: In charge of all new member events that occur during the pledge process. Holds new member meetings, new member events, and serves as the liaison between sisters and new members. VP New Member Education handles all issues the new members may have during the pledge process and is responsible to correspond with the chapter adviser and nationals during the pledge process.

VP Programming: Responsible to set up events for the chapter with on-campus residences, the overall university Panhellenic and Inter-Greek Community (IGC) boards, and the sorority's national philanthropies. These include educational events as well as philanthropic events.

VP Philanthropy: Responsible for planning and organizing philanthropic events to support AEPhi's national charities, Sharsharet and the Elisabeth Glaser Pediatric AIDS Foundation. Philanthropy also coordinates community service events with other chapters on campuses.

Notable members 
Barbara Barrie (Omega) – actress; (Barney Miller)
Marilyn Beck (Xi) – Hollywood columnist and author
Carol Lynn Blum (Alpha Eta) – 1965 Miss Florida, third runner up Miss America 1966
Lillian Copeland (Xi) – Olympic Gold and Silver medalist in discus; set world records in discus, javelin, and shot put
Miriam Freund-Rosenthal (Zeta) American Jewish civic leader
Ruth Bader Ginsburg (Kappa) – Supreme Court Justice
Elizabeth Glaser (Sigma) – AIDS activist and co-founder of The Elizabeth Glaser Pediatric AIDS Foundation
Nancy Goodman Brinker (Mu) – Founder of the Susan G. Komen Foundation for Breast Cancer Research; appointed in 2001 as Ambassador to Hungary
Erica Hill (Alpha Chi) – CNN anchor
Randi Kaye (Alpha Chi) – reporter and CNN anchor
Bessie Margolin (Epsilon) – former U.S. Department of Labor attorney
Stacey Nuveman (Phi) – Gold medalist for Softball at the 2000 Summer Olympics
Dayssi Olarte de Kanavos (Kappa) – socialite, philanthropist, real estate executive
Charlotte Rae (Omicron) – actress; (Diff'rent Strokes, The Facts of Life)
Nan Rich (Alpha Tau) – former member of the Florida House of Representatives and Florida Senate
Judith Resnik (Alpha Nu) – 2nd American woman astronaut
Dinah Shore (Chi) – singer, actress and talk show host
Annette Strauss (Omega) – former mayor of Dallas
Carmen Warschaw (Phi) – California philanthropist and politician
Bonnie Glick (Kappa) - politician, diplomat, and businesswoman
Lauren Weisberger (Kappa) – author, (The Devil Wears Prada)
Harriett Woods (Pi) – former Lt. Governor of Missouri

Chapters

See also 
List of Jewish fraternities and sororities
List of social fraternities and sororities
National Panhellenic Conference

References

External links 
Alpha Epsilon Phi website

 
Student organizations established in 1909
National Panhellenic Conference
Student societies in the United States
Historically Jewish sororities in the United States
1909 establishments in New York City
Jewish organizations established in 1909